LALD is an initialism that may refer to:

Live and Let Die
Live and Let Die (novel), a James Bond novel by Ian Fleming
Live and Let Die (film), a 1973 film starring Roger Moore loosely based upon the novel
Live and Let Die (soundtrack), the soundtrack album of the 1973 film
"Live and Let Die" (song), a song by Paul McCartney and Wings from the above soundtrack
Live and Let Die (album), the final album by hip-hop duo Kool G Rap & DJ Polo
 Lysosomal Acid Lipase Deficiency, a disease caused when the body does not produce enough active lysosomal acid lipase enzyme
 Liquid Atomic Layer Deposition

See also
 Live and Let Die (disambiguation)